The Yokatsu Islands (与勝諸島, Yokatsu-shotō) are a group of islands located near the Katsuren Peninsula of Okinawa Prefecture, Japan. It consists of both inhabited and uninhabited islets.

Islands 
The Yokatsu Islands consist of the following:

 Ikei Island
 Hamahiga Island
 Henza Island
 Minamiukibara Island
 Miyagi Island
 Tsuken Island
 Ukibara Island
 Yabuchi Island

References 

Yokatsu Islands